The Virginia Tech – Wake Forest University School of Biomedical Engineering & Sciences is a Biomedical Engineering and Sciences School affiliated with Virginia Tech and Wake Forest University. In 2003, the School of Biomedical Engineering & Science was established as a joint partnership. The school offers Masters and Doctorate degrees in biomedical engineering as well as a joint DVM-PhD degree in collaboration with the Virginia–Maryland College of Veterinary Medicine.

Future growth
Both universities are expected to increase the biomedical research.  Recently, the school has taken ownership of three new research facilities over the past year for a total of over 80,000 square feet of dedicated biomedical engineering research and teaching space at both Virginia Tech and Wake Forest University.

Faculty and research
Currently the school has 76 tenure track faculty (25 primary and 51 joint) as well as an additional 68 affiliate faculty appointments in the biomedical program. The school has a growth plan that has added 45 faculty in the past 3 years. Over the past academic year, the biomedical engineering faculty have published 200 journal papers and an additional 200 conference papers.

References

External links

Public universities and colleges in Virginia
Wake Forest University
Virginia Tech